Scotland's Gardens is a horticultural charity established in 1931 and based in Edinburgh. It raises money for other charities by opening otherwise private gardens throughout the country to the general public. The criteria to have your garden listed in the "Yellow Book" are tough, and it is considered a challenge to achieve a listing.

40% of the funds raised are given to charities selected by the owners of the gardens. Over 200 charities benefit every year. The other 60% of funds are given to four charities selected by Scotland's Gardens:
Queen's Nursing Institute Scotland
the Garden's Fund of the National Trust for Scotland
Maggie's Cancer Caring Centres
Perennial

Event
In addition to the gardens listed in its "Yellow Book" the charity also promotes several larger annual events, for example:
Orkney Garden Festival
Rhododendron Festival
Scottish Snowdrop Festival

Participating gardens
Some of the more noted listed gardens include:
Carolside, Borders
Garden of Cosmic Speculation, near Dumfries
Granton Garden, Edinburgh
Kailzie Gardens, Borders
Kildrummy Castle, Aberdeenshire
Dean Gardens, Edinburgh
Cakemuir Castle
Kilcoy Castle, the Black Isle
Kincardine Castle, Royal Deeside
Ross Priory, West Dunbartonshire 
Row House, Stirling
Yair House, Borders
Scottish Dark Sky Observatory, near Dalmellington

See also
Gardening in Scotland
National Gardens Scheme, a similar organisation in England, Northern Ireland, Wales and The Channel Islands.

References

External links
Official website

1931 establishments in Scotland
 
Horticultural organisations based in the United Kingdom
Charities based in Edinburgh
Organizations established in 1931
Garden festivals in Scotland
Scottish awards